The 1969 European Rowing Championships were rowing championships held on the Wörthersee in the Austrian city of Klagenfurt. This edition of the European Rowing Championships was held from 5 to 7 September for women, and a few days later for men. Women entered in five boat classes (W1x, W2x, W4x+, W4+, W8+), and 15 countries—including the United States—sent 47 boats. Men competed in all seven Olympic boat classes (M1x, M2x, M2-, M2+, M4-, M4+, M8+). An innovation was that petite finals were held to determine places 7 to 12.

Background
At its congress held in conjunction with the 1967 European Rowing Championships in Vichy, the International Rowing Federation (FISA) had decided that the 1969 Championships would be held on the Lake of Banyoles in Spain. Circumstances changed and the event moved to Austria.

Medal summary – women's events

Medal summary – men's events

References

European Rowing Championships
European Rowing Championships
Rowing
Rowing
Rowing
Sports competitions in Klagenfurt